The Canadian Forces College (CFC) is a military school for senior and general officers of the Canadian Armed Forces. The college provides graduate-level military education courses to enable officers to develop their leadership quality within the Canadian Forces in a whole-of-government framework.

History
The institution was established on the grounds of the Strathroy Estate (formerly owned by Frederick Burton Robins) in 1943 as the Royal Canadian Air Force War Staff College. In 1945, the college was re-designated as the Royal Canadian Air Force Staff College, which became a component of the Air Force College in 1962. The Air Force College also included a Headquarters, a Staff School and an Extension School. Following integration of the Canadian Armed Forces, the college was renamed  the Canadian Forces College (CFC) in 1966.  In 1991 the building containing the Officers' Mess was designated a "Recognized Federal Heritage Building" by the Government of Canada.

The CFC is located at 215 Yonge Boulevard at Wilson Avenue in the Armour Heights neighborhood of Toronto, Ontario. The Canadian Forces Staff School for junior officers, formerly located at 1107 Avenue Road, was determined to be redundant and closed in 1994, and the property was later sold to the Metropolitan Separate School Board (now called the Toronto Catholic District School Board) as Marshall McLuhan Catholic Secondary School, opened in 1998.

Responsibilities
 Provide high-quality professional military education for selected Canadian and international officers, and selected non-commissioned members.
 Establish a fully bilingual setting where education is achieved in the official language of choice.
 Hold a body of professional knowledge across the spectrum of conflict and firmly rooted in doctrine that provides the framework for course material appropriate for Officer Development
 Maintain an effective partnership with the Royal Military College of Canada to deepen the academic nature of the curricula and to support accreditation of the programmes.
 Maintain effective liaison with national and foreign educational institutions for purposes of sharing reference, doctrine, exercise and simulation and teaching materials.
 Seek high-quality guest speakers in support of the CFC curricula.
 Efficiently and effectively command, control and administer the allocated personnel and financial resources.
 Contribute to the goals and vision of the Canadian Defence Academy and of the Canadian Forces.
 Contribute to the continued improvement of the Profession of Arms in Canada.

Programmes
 Joint Command and Staff Programme (JCSP)
 National Security Programme (NSP)
 Joint Command and Staff Programme Distance Learning (JCSP DL)
 Joint Staff Operations Programme (JSOP)
 Canadian Security Studies Programme (CSSP)
 Executive Leaders' Programme (ELP)

See also
 Royal Military College Saint-Jean
 Royal Roads Military College
 Royal Military College of Canada
 Canadian government scientific research organizations
 Canadian university scientific research organizations
 Canadian industrial research and development organizations
 The Canadian Crown and the Canadian Forces
 Defence Research and Development Canada
 Khaki University

Notes

References
Canadian Forces College Home Page

External links
 Canadian Forces College luncheon talk given at The Royal Canadian Military Institute on 20-Sep-2011

 

Educational institutions established in 1943
Military education and training in Canada
Canadian Armed Forces
Military history of Canada
Naval academies
Air force academies
Universities and colleges in Toronto
Royal Canadian Air Force
Military academies of Canada
Canadian Armed Forces education and training establishments
Staff colleges
1943 establishments in Canada